The twenty-second season of Saturday Night Live, an American sketch comedy series, originally aired in the United States on NBC between September 28, 1996, and May 17, 1997.

This season is notable for the host selection. Seven of the 20 hosts were former cast members. They included Dana Carvey, Robert Downey, Jr. (the second of three season 11 cast members to come back and host the show, joining Damon Wayans [who hosted during the show's 20th season] and, later in season 23, Jon Lovitz), Phil Hartman, Chris Rock, Martin Short (who hosted before with Steve Martin and Chevy Chase on the show's 12th season, and the only cast member out of the seven to not have worked under Lorne Michaels, as Short was a Dick Ebersol cast member), Chevy Chase, and Mike Myers. This would mark Chase's final time hosting before getting banned (returning much later for numerous guest appearances).

Cast
Many changes happened before the start of the season. David Koechner and Nancy Walls were both let go after one season and longtime cast member David Spade left the show on his own terms.

Comedian and singer Ana Gasteyer and stand-up comedian Tracy Morgan were hired to replace Koechner and Walls, being promoted to repertory status when hired.

Chris Kattan was promoted to repertory status, while Colin Quinn and Fred Wolf remained as featured players.

This was the final season for Mark McKinney. Wolf also left his position as featured player and co-head writer after the season's first three episodes. Also, this was the final season to show the Dolby Surround and NBC logos during the opening montage.

Cast roster

Repertory players
Jim Breuer
Will Ferrell
Ana Gasteyer
Darrell Hammond
Chris Kattan
Norm Macdonald
Mark McKinney
Tim Meadows
Tracy Morgan
Cheri Oteri
Molly Shannon

Featured players
Colin Quinn
Fred Wolf (final episode: October 19, 1996)

bold denotes Weekend Update anchor

Writers

Robert Carlock and Stephen Colbert join the writing staff in this season.

Episodes

References

22
Saturday Night Live in the 1990s
1996 American television seasons
1997 American television seasons
Television shows directed by Beth McCarthy-Miller